Valeriu Caceanov (Russian: Валерий Качанов, born 12 July 1954) is a Soviet athlete. He competed in the men's decathlon at the 1980 Summer Olympics.

References

External links
 

1954 births
Living people
Athletes (track and field) at the 1980 Summer Olympics
Soviet decathletes
Moldovan decathletes
Olympic athletes of the Soviet Union
Athletes from Saint Petersburg
Universiade medalists in athletics (track and field)
Universiade silver medalists for the Soviet Union